Owings Mills, Maryland is a suburb of Baltimore, Maryland, in the United States.

Owings Mills may also refer to:
Owings Mills (Metro Subway station), the most northwestern stop on the Baltimore Metro Subway
Owings Mills Town Center, a large shopping mall in Owings Mills
Owings Mills High School, a public high school in Owings Mills
Owings Mills Boulevard, a major road in Owings Mills
Owings Mills New Town, an area of Owings Mills